The first season of The Fine Brothers'  web series, MyMusic premiered on April 15, 2012 and ended on January 6, 2013. The series is based on a concept that the Fine Brothers originally developed for a television airing. Sometime afterwards, the concept was adapted for YouTube. MyMusic was the main show on the MyMusicShow YouTube channel, which was one of the first 100 original channels.

Plot
The first season of MyMusic, a mockumentary, documented the antics of MyMusic, a transmedia production company. The staff members refer to each other by music genres which they associate each other with, rather than their real names.  CEO and founder Indie heads the team. The company claims to have been given the YouTube original channel, and has a documentary crew filming them day to day. The first season's events and plot were recapped by the Fine Brothers, prior to the second season.

Cast

Main Cast

 Adam Busch portrays Jeb Indie, more commonly known as Indie, a modern-day hipster and the CEO of MyMusic. 
 Grace Helbig portrays Jamie Woods, known as Idol, the Social Media Guru of MyMusic, who is obsessed with social media. 
Jarrett Sleeper portrays Emmet Allan Klaga, known as Metal, who is a metalhead and the Head of Production of MyMusic.
 Tania Gunadi & Chris Clowers portray Techno & Dubstep, two ravers who make up MyMusic's Talent Booking team. They are often seen together, and Techno is the only staff member who understands Dubstep's language, which consists of "wubbing".
Mychal Thompson portrays Curtis Armstrong, known as Hip Hop, who is the Head of Marketing of MyMusic, who is built on a "gangster" image, but is truly a nerd who enjoys role-playing games.
Lainey Lipson portrays Norma Haish, known as  Scene, who is an intern at MyMusic, and displays a "scene kid" personality.
 Jack Douglass portrays Melvin Munson, known as Intern 2, an intern at MyMusic, who unlike the other staff members has not been identified with a music genre. He also displays a bland and generic white collar personality.

Recurring Cast

Notable Guests

Episodes
Every five to six episode of the series are split into full-length "sitcom versions" that include extra scenes.

Awards and nominations
The first season of MyMusic drew ten Streamy award nominations. However, the series did not win any of its nominations.

References

2010s YouTube series seasons